Bryce Gibbs (born 15 March 1989) is a retired professional Australian rules footballer who played for the Carlton Football Club and the Adelaide Football Club in the Australian Football League (AFL).

Pre-AFL 
Gibbs was an exceptional youth talent, which led to much speculation about his ultimate AFL drafting. In 2004 he won Glenelg's Under 17s best and fairest award, despite spending part of the season playing SANFL reserve grade. That year he also captained the South Australian under 16s team at the national championships.

From round 7 of the 2005 season, at age 16, he debuted in Glenelg's League team and was a regular until the end of the 2006 season. Playing as a teenager against grown men in the SANFL, Gibbs excelled, coming third in the club's 2006 best and fairest and dominating recent former AFL players during the season.

He featured prominently in the 2006 under-18 national championships where he was captain of South Australia. He was selected as the All-Australian ruck rover and was judged South Australia's Most Valuable Player. He also co-captained the Australian youth side against an Irish youth side in an international tournament in Australia in 2006.

Recruitment
Speculation that Gibbs would be the No. 1 draft pick began early in the 2006 season. Although his father Ross Gibbs had a 253-game career with Glenelg, Bryce was ineligible to be taken by the Adelaide Crows under the father–son rule, much to the Crows' chagrin, because Ross had not yet played 200 of those games before the Crows entered the Australian Football League in 1991.

When Essendon and Carlton met in round 16 of 2006, the sides were firmly entrenched at the bottom of the ladder, with Carlton having lost its last seven games and Essendon a then-club-record fourteen. Speculation that the result would decide the wooden spoon (and hence the first draft pick) led to the game jokingly being dubbed the "Bryce Gibbs Cup" by some in the media. The match ended in a draw.

Carlton ultimately finished last, and subsequently selected Gibbs with the first overall pick in the 2006 AFL draft (held on 25 November 2006). He was given the No. 4 guernsey, formerly worn by club champion and administrator (and later, president), Stephen Kernahan, who was also close friend and former Glenelg teammate of Gibbs' father.

AFL career
Gibbs was named in Carlton's leadership group for the 2007 AFL season without having played a single AFL match, which is the first time in history this has happened.

He made his debut in round one against Richmond and kicked a goal with his first kick while becoming the 1100th player to play for Carlton. 17 disposals at 100 percent efficiency and a great shut-down role on Brownlow Medallist Jason Akermanis in round 10 earned Gibbs his nomination for the NAB Rising Star award.

Gibbs played every game of the 2007 season and kicked five goals. Most of his development and experience has been in the backline where he has played as a half back flanker.

In 2008, new coach Brett Ratten reduced the size of the leadership group, and Gibbs was excluded from the new group. Gibbs played games as both an attacking midfielder and as a tagger throughout the season, playing very well in both roles. As a tagger, he convincingly beat several top-class opponents, including Chad Cornes (nine disposals), Heath Shaw (six disposals) and Adam Goodes, whom he held to seven disposals while collecting 26 of his own. In the midfield, he showed strong team ethic, very accurate disposal by foot, strong tackling, and very good football smarts and awareness. He collected seven Brownlow votes during the season and finished 5th in the club best and fairest.

In 2009, Gibbs began playing mainly as an attacking midfielder, and much less as a tagger. He finished the season with a total of 615 disposals (averaging 26.7) which was ranked ninth in the league, and polled 15 votes in the Brownlow Medal to finish equal ninth, and finished third in the club best and fairest.

In 2010, Gibbs began to divide his time between the midfield and the half-back line, playing as a rebounding defender. In round 10, his 45 disposals tied Greg Williams' efforts as the most by a Carlton player in a single game (since records were kept in 1984). Gibbs finished fourth in the club best and fairest for 2010.

In 2011, Gibbs celebrated his 100 games for Carlton against the Brisbane Lions.

In June 2012, Gibbs re-signed with Carlton for a further two years.

In June 2014, Gibbs signed a new five-year deal with Carlton keeping him at the club until the end of the 2019 season. He went on to win his first John Nicholls Medal and was also named in the All Australian 40-man squad.

Despite being contracted to Carlton, Gibbs announced at the conclusion of the 2016 season that he wanted to return to South Australia for family reasons and requested a trade. After failing to facilitate a trade with the Adelaide Football Club, he stayed with Carlton.

Carlton and Adelaide re-entered trade talks during the 2017 AFL trade season and finalised a trade to send Gibbs to Adelaide.

Gibbs announced his retirement on 10 September 2020 and played his final AFL game in a match between Adelaide and Carlton on 13 September 2020.

Statistics
  Statistics are correct to end of the 2017 season

|-

! scope="row" style="text-align:center" | 2007
|style="text-align:center;"|
| 4 || 22 || 5 || 6 || 166 || 120 || 286 || 94 || 62 || 0.2 || 0.3 || 7.6 || 5.5 || 13.0 || 4.3 || 2.8
|- style="background-color: #EAEAEA"
! scope="row" style="text-align:center" | 2008
|style="text-align:center;"|
| 4 || 21 || 14 || 3 || 242 || 193 || 435 || 118 || 73 || 0.7 || 0.1 || 11.5 || 9.2 || 20.7 || 5.6 || 3.5
|-
! scope="row" style="text-align:center" | 2009
|style="text-align:center;"|
| 4 || 23 || 15 || 8 || 321 || 294 || 615 || 141 || 92 || 0.7 || 0.4 || 14.0 || 12.8 || 26.7 || 6.1 || 4.0
|- style="background-color: #EAEAEA"
! scope="row" style="text-align:center" | 2010
|style="text-align:center;"|
| 4 || 23 || 6 || 11 || 342 || 218 || 560 || 127 || 82 || 0.3 || 0.5 || 14.9 || 9.5 || 24.6 || 5.5 || 3.6
|-
! scope="row" style="text-align:center" | 2011
|style="text-align:center;"|
| 4 || 23 || 21 || 18 || 381 || 167 || 548 || 174 || 82 || 0.9 || 0.8 || 16.6 || 7.3 || 23.8 || 7.6 || 3.6
|- style="background-color: #EAEAEA"
! scope="row" style="text-align:center" | 2012
|style="text-align:center;"|
| 4 || 22 || 8 || 9 || 317 || 164 || 481 || 114 || 91 || 0.4 || 0.4 || 14.4 || 7.5 || 21.9 || 5.2 || 4.1
|-
! scope="row" style="text-align:center" | 2013
|style="text-align:center;"|
| 4 || 21 || 11 || 6 || 302 || 167 || 469 || 92 || 75 || 0.5 || 0.3 || 14.4 || 8.0 || 22.3 || 4.4 || 3.6
|- style="background-color: #EAEAEA"
! scope="row" style="text-align:center" | 2014
|style="text-align:center;"|
| 4 || 22 || 18 || 15 || 308 || 237 || 545 || 89 || 108 || 0.8 || 0.7 || 14.0 || 10.8 || 24.8 || 4.1 || 4.9
|-
! scope="row" style="text-align:center" | 2015
|style="text-align:center;"|
| 4 || 10 || 4 || 5 || 112 || 97 || 209 || 21 || 54 || 0.0 || 0.5 || 11.2 || 9.7 || 20.9 || 2.1 || 5.4
|- style="background-color: #EAEAEA"
! scope="row" style="text-align:center" | 2016
|style="text-align:center;"|
| 4 || 22 || 18 || 12 || 320 || 270 || 590 || 77 || 114 || 0.8 || 0.6 || 14.6 || 12.3 || 26.8 || 3.5 || 5.2
|-
! scope="row" style="text-align:center" | 2017
|style="text-align:center;"|
| 4 || 22 || 17 || 13 || 362 || 228 || 590 || 114 || 129 || 0.8 || 0.6 || 16.5 || 10.4 || 26.8 || 5.2 || 5.9
|-
! scope="row" style="text-align:center" | 2018
|style="text-align:center;"|
| 6 || 22 || 13 || 15 || 354 || 215 || 569 || 82 || 118 || 0.6 || 0.7 || 16.1 || 9.8 || 25.9 || 3.7 || 5.4
|-
! scope="row" style="text-align:center" | 2019
|style="text-align:center;"|
| 6 || 12 || 2 || 1 || 154 || 84 || 238|| 48 || 47 || 0.2 || 0.1 || 16.1 || 12.8 || 19.8|| 4 || 3.9
|- class="sortbottom"
! colspan=3| Career
! 265
! 246
! 122
! 3681
! 2454
! 6135
! 1291
! 1127
! 0.6
! 0.5
! 13.9
! 9.3
! 23.2
! 4.9
! 4.3
|}

Personal life
Gibbs is the son of former SANFL and WAFL player Ross Gibbs.

Gibbs graduated from Brighton Secondary School in 2006 where he sat his South Australian Certificate of Education (SACE).

Gibbs founded his own clothing line, Tushay Clothing, along with former Carlton and Collingwood player Jordan Russell.

Gibbs and his partner, Lauren Tscharke, have a son Charlie and daughter Madison.

Outside football
Gibbs, along with team-mate Nick Stevens, appeared in the popular Australian drama Neighbours in October 2008. He has represented South Australia in volleyball.

References

External links 

Bryce Gibbs profile in Blueseum
 
 
 

1989 births
Living people
Adelaide Football Club players
Carlton Football Club players
Glenelg Football Club players
South Adelaide Football Club players
Australian rules footballers from South Australia
John Nicholls Medal winners
Magarey Medal winners
Australia international rules football team players